Everardia may refer to:
 Everardia (bug), a genus of true bugs in the family Pentatomidae
 Everardia (plant), a genus of plants in the family Cyperaceae